Jamshed Akhtar (born 1947, Faizabad, India) is an Indian writer and researcher. He graduated from Aligarh Muslim University, India, in 1969, with a degree in Electrical Engineering. He is involved in the scientific study of religion and has written two books on this topic.

Books
His first book The Ultimate Revelations, published in 1996, is probably the  only Science fiction in the world with Quran as the central topic. 
The book outlines his research related to the possibility of coded information in Quran. It was well covered by almost all the major newspapers of India  and UAE (Times of India - Feb 23rd, 1997, The Sunday Observer - May 18–24, 1997, The Hindu - 
July 7, 1997, Islamic Voice - Feb 23rd, 1997, Khaleej Times - May 2, 1998, Gulf News - May 1, 1998). In UAE, the book was presented at 'The Book Mall' by Shaikha Azza, daughter of HH Dr. Sheikh Sultan bin Muhammad Al-Qasimi, the ruler of Sharjah (Gulf News).

In 2010, his second book, a non-fiction, In Search of Our Origins has been published. This book presents his research on the origins of life and man in the light of revelations from Quran.

Talk on Noah
In 1998, Akhtar presented a talk on the time, place and source of Noah’s Flood, and a possible location of Noah’s Ark, combining pointers from Quran with scientific findings. This paper was presented in a workshop jointly organized by Muslim Association for Advancement of Science (MAAS) and Centre for Studies on Sciences (CSOS) at Khandala.

Institute of Revealed Knowledge
Akhtar has established an online Institute of Revealed Knowledge  to collaborate with other researchers of different faiths and to initiate collective investigation of the information in revelations through a panel of linguists, science historians and scientists of various disciplines.

Literacy Drive
Apart from the study on Quran, he is also involved in promoting literacy among rural children of Faizabad, India. He is the Founder Trustee of 'Foundation for Social Care', and President of Faiz-e-Aam Muslim Educational Society. Faiz-e-Aam in association with AFMI was responsible for Faizabad Literacy Project, which has been hailed as a model educational scheme.

Project IMDAAD
In 2002, in collaboration with Institute of Objective Studies (IOS), Jamshed Akhtar designed and initiated Project IMDAAD to connect Muslim primary schools and mosques all over India with the Internet. Its objective was to disseminate information on education, health, business and awareness, and to collect feedback from the masses.

Bibliography

 The Ultimate Revelations (1996) - Science Fiction
 Project IMDAAD (2002)
 Faizabad Literacy Project (2004) - Documentary by Jamshed Akhtar
 In Search of Our Origins (2010), revised and updated (April 2012) - Non Fiction

References

External links
 Official website
 Documentary - Faizabad Literacy Project
 Blog - In Search Of Our Origins
 Blog - The Ultimate Revelations

1947 births
Indian religious writers
Living people